Ministry of Education, Research and Culture in the Faroe Islands is responsible for education, research and culture in the Faroe Islands. The Ministry is also responsible for the pedagogical part of the day care, the ecclesiastical affairs and other, the Radio and TV broadcasting and sports.

History 
The ministry of Culture was established in 1963 as the Ministry of Municipalities, Culture and Schools (Faroese: Kommunu-, menta- og skúlamálaráð) and has been a ministry with different names since then, except for 1979–81, when culture was not mentioned in any of the names of the minsteries.

The current minister is Jenis av Rana from the Centre party. The current Permanent Secretary is Poul Geert Hansen.

Location 
The Ministry of Education, Research and Culture is located in Tórshavn on Hoyvíksvegur 72.

Institutions 
 Altjóða Skrivstovan
 Fólkakirkjan
 University of the Faroe Islands
 Kringvarp Føroya
 Listasavn Føroya
 Mentanargrunnur Landsins
 Granskingarráðið
 Nordic House in the Faroe Islands 
 Søvn Landsins
 Føroya Fornminnissavn
 Føroya Landsbókasavn
 Føroya Landsskjalasavn
 Føroya Náttúrugripasavn
 Tjóðpallur Føroya
 Fólkaskúlin
 Frítíðarundirvísingin (Evening school)
 Føroya Fólkaháskúli
 Føroya Musikkskúli
 Húsarhaldsskúlin
 Sernámsfrøðiligt virksemi (schools and institutions for handicapped children)
 Nám
 Fiskivinnuskúlin
 Føroya Brandskúli
 Handilsskúlar (Business schools)
 Heilsuskúli Føroya
 Vinnuháskúlin
 Sjónám
 Føroya Studentaskúli og HF-Skeið
 Technical schools
 Yrkisdepilin (Responsible for the vocational educations)
 Studni

See also

 Education in the Faroe Islands
 List of Cultural Ministers of the Faroe Islands

References

External links
The Ministry's official website

Culture ministries
Faroe Islands
Faroese culture
Government ministries of the Faroe Islands
Faroe Islands
Research ministries